Collinstown may refer the following:

 Collinstown, County Westmeath, Ireland 
 Collinstown, Santry, County Dublin, Ireland; location of Dublin Airport
 Collinstown, North Carolina, U.S.A.

See also
 Collins (surname)